The 1946 Pittsburgh Pirates season was the 65th in the history of the Major League Baseball franchise and its jubilee of diamonds in the National League. The Pirates finished seventh in the league standings with a record of 63–91, and attracted 749,962 fans to Forbes Field, also seventh in the eight-team Senior Circuit and 13th among the 16 MLB clubs.

It was a year of transition for the Pirates. Ralph Kiner made his debut, and he proceeded to lead the National League in home runs with 23. He was one of only two NL players to reach 20+ home runs that year (Johnny Mize was runner-up with 22), but 1946 would be the first of seven straight years in which Kiner would lead his league, or tie for the lead, in homers en route to the Baseball Hall of Fame.

On August 8, the Pirates changed hands for the first time since 1900 when the heirs of Hall of Fame owner Barney Dreyfuss sold the franchise to a syndicate led by Indianapolis banker Frank E. McKinney and including John W. Galbreath, Thomas P. Johnson and Bing Crosby.

The sale was accompanied by changes in the dugout and front office. Frankie Frisch, manager since , resigned his post September 27 with three games to go in the season. After coach Spud Davis finished the campaign, the Pirates acquired 37-year-old Billy Herman, like Frisch a Hall of Fame second baseman, and named him playing manager for 1947. General manager Ray Kennedy, in only his first year in the position, was demoted by the new owners to farm system director and replaced by Roy Hamey.

In addition, the 1946 Pirates were the focus of an unsuccessful unionizing campaign by the recently formed American Baseball Guild. After the Guild successfully enrolled 34 of the club's 36 roster players when the season began, it was rebuffed by Pirates' then-president William Benswanger when it attempted to start collective bargaining talks. In response, the Guild called for a strike authorization vote on June 7 before a game at Forbes Field. Although 20 of the team's 36 players voted yes to a strike, the union fell short of the needed two-thirds supermajority, and the Guild movement collapsed. Players would form their own association in 1953, and the MLBPA would become their first official bargaining unit in 1966.

Regular season

Season standings

Record vs. opponents

Game log

|- bgcolor="ccffcc"
| 1 || April 16 || @ Cardinals || 6–4 || Heintzelman (1–0) || Brecheen || — || 14,000 || 1–0
|- bgcolor="ffbbbb"
| 2 || April 17 || @ Cardinals || 0–6 || Lanier || Gables (0–1) || — || 4,819 || 1–1
|- bgcolor="ffbbbb"
| 3 || April 18 || @ Cardinals || 2–6 || Pollet || Strincevich (0–1) || — || 6,328 || 1–2
|- bgcolor="ccffcc"
| 4 || April 20 || Reds || 2–1 || Sewell (1–0) || Walters || — || 27,891 || 2–2
|- bgcolor="ffbbbb"
| 5 || April 21 || Reds || 2–8 || Heusser || Hopper (0–1) || — ||  || 2–3
|- bgcolor="ffbbbb"
| 6 || April 21 || Reds || 3–4 || Beggs || Hallett (0–1) || — || 30,237 || 2–4
|- bgcolor="ffbbbb"
| 7 || April 23 || Cubs || 1–3 || Passeau || Albosta (0–1) || — || 8,224 || 2–5
|- bgcolor="ccffcc"
| 8 || April 24 || Cubs || 4–3 || Sewell (2–0) || Schmitz || — || 6,287 || 3–5
|- bgcolor="ccffcc"
| 9 || April 25 || Cardinals || 5–3 || Heintzelman (2–0) || Brecheen || Roe (1) || 10,585 || 4–5
|- bgcolor="ffbbbb"
| 10 || April 26 || Cardinals || 2–3 || Martin || Ostermueller (0–1) || — || 4,885 || 4–6
|- bgcolor="ffbbbb"
| 11 || April 27 || @ Reds || 2–5 || Beggs || Strincevich (0–2) || — || 3,086 || 4–7
|- bgcolor="ffbbbb"
| 12 || April 28 || @ Reds || 1–7 || Heusser || Sewell (2–1) || — || 24,002 || 4–8
|- bgcolor="ccffcc"
| 13 || April 30 || Phillies || 4–1 || Hallett (1–1) || Hughes || — || 4,970 || 5–8
|-

|- bgcolor="ffbbbb"
| 14 || May 1 || Phillies || 0–8 || Pearson || Albosta (0–2) || — || 4,426 || 5–9
|- bgcolor="ccffcc"
| 15 || May 2 || Phillies || 8–3 || Ostermueller (1–1) || Judd || — || 3,458 || 6–9
|- bgcolor="ccffcc"
| 16 || May 3 || Braves || 3–2 || Heintzelman (3–0) || Sain || — ||  || 7–9
|- bgcolor="ccffcc"
| 17 || May 5 || Dodgers || 5–4 (11) || Hallett (2–1) || Lombardi || — ||  || 8–9
|- bgcolor="ccffcc"
| 18 || May 5 || Dodgers || 4–3 (6) || Roe (1–0) || Casey || — || 37,953 || 9–9
|- bgcolor="ffbbbb"
| 19 || May 8 || Giants || 0–1 || Koslo || Ostermueller (1–2) || — || 6,267 || 9–10
|- bgcolor="ffbbbb"
| 20 || May 9 || Giants || 1–6 || Voiselle || Roe (1–1) || — || 7,786 || 9–11
|- bgcolor="ffbbbb"
| 21 || May 12 || @ Cubs || 1–3 || Passeau || Heintzelman (3–1) || — || 22,065 || 9–12
|- bgcolor="ffbbbb"
| 22 || May 14 || @ Braves || 1–5 || Wallace || Gables (0–2) || — || 20,762 || 9–13
|- bgcolor="ffbbbb"
| 23 || May 17 || @ Dodgers || 6–16 || Hatten || Strincevich (0–3) || — || 9,307 || 9–14
|- bgcolor="ccffcc"
| 24 || May 19 || @ Giants || 3–1 || Ostermueller (2–2) || Kennedy || — ||  || 10–14
|- bgcolor="ffbbbb"
| 25 || May 19 || @ Giants || 1–5 || Koslo || Heintzelman (3–2) || — || 39,482 || 10–15
|- bgcolor="ffbbbb"
| 26 || May 22 || @ Phillies || 2–6 || Rowe || Heintzelman (3–3) || Karl || 4,813 || 10–16
|- bgcolor="ccffcc"
| 27 || May 23 || @ Phillies || 10–2 || Bahr (1–0) || Hughes || — || 4,746 || 11–16
|- bgcolor="ccffcc"
| 28 || May 24 || Cubs || 6–3 || Roe (2–1) || Borowy || — || 27,432 || 12–16
|- bgcolor="ccffcc"
| 29 || May 26 || Cubs || 8–2 || Heintzelman (4–3) || Bithorn || — || 13,000 || 13–16
|- bgcolor="ccffcc"
| 30 || May 28 || Reds || 6–3 || Bahr (2–0) || Heusser || Strincevich (1) || 16,995 || 14–16
|- bgcolor="ffbbbb"
| 31 || May 29 || Reds || 6–7 || Gumbert || Strincevich (0–4) || — || 4,112 || 14–17
|- bgcolor="ccffcc"
| 32 || May 30 || Cardinals || 9–3 || Ostermueller (3–2) || Krist || — ||  || 15–17
|- bgcolor="ffbbbb"
| 33 || May 30 || Cardinals || 11–12 || Schmidt || Hallett (2–2) || Wilks || 34,985 || 15–18
|-

|- bgcolor="ccffcc"
| 34 || June 2 || Phillies || 5–1 || Sewell (3–1) || Hughes || — ||  || 16–18
|- bgcolor="ffbbbb"
| 35 || June 2 || Phillies || 3–10 || Jurisich || Bahr (2–1) || Karl || 8,971 || 16–19
|- bgcolor="ffbbbb"
| 36 || June 3 || Phillies || 4–8 || Schanz || Albosta (0–3) || Karl || 2,175 || 16–20
|- bgcolor="ccffcc"
| 37 || June 4 || Dodgers || 4–3 || Ostermueller (4–2) || Casey || — ||  || 17–20
|- bgcolor="ffbbbb"
| 38 || June 4 || Dodgers || 6–7 (11) || Webber || Lanning (0–1) || Head || 11,521 || 17–21
|- bgcolor="ffbbbb"
| 39 || June 5 || Dodgers || 3–5 || Higbe || Roe (2–2) || Melton || 26,206 || 17–22
|- bgcolor="ffbbbb"
| 40 || June 6 || Dodgers || 8–13 || Behrman || Sewell (3–2) || Herring || 3,093 || 17–23
|- bgcolor="ccffcc"
| 41 || June 7 || Giants || 10–5 || Bahr (3–1) || Voiselle || Gables (1) || 16,884 || 18–23
|- bgcolor="ffbbbb"
| 42 || June 8 || Giants || 3–5 || Koslo || Strincevich (0–5) || — || 5,785 || 18–24
|- bgcolor="ccffcc"
| 43 || June 9 || Giants || 2–1 || Ostermueller (5–2) || Kennedy || — ||  || 19–24
|- bgcolor="ccffcc"
| 44 || June 9 || Giants || 5–1 || Lanning (1–1) || Joyce || — || 24,787 || 20–24
|- bgcolor="ffbbbb"
| 45 || June 10 || Braves || 5–10 || Wright || Roe (2–3) || Posedel || 3,652 || 20–25
|- bgcolor="ccffcc"
| 46 || June 11 || Braves || 5–3 || Sewell (4–2) || Cooper || — || 17,181 || 21–25
|- bgcolor="ffbbbb"
| 47 || June 15 || @ Phillies || 1–3 || Rowe || Strincevich (0–6) || Mauney || 23,804 || 21–26
|- bgcolor="ffbbbb"
| 48 || June 16 || @ Phillies || 3–4 || Raffensberger || Sewell (4–3) || Hughes ||  || 21–27
|- bgcolor="ccffcc"
| 49 || June 16 || @ Phillies || 10–1 || Ostermueller (6–2) || Stanceu || — || 36,910 || 22–27
|- bgcolor="ffbbbb"
| 50 || June 17 || @ Phillies || 3–7 || Mauney || Gables (0–3) || — || 16,529 || 22–28
|- bgcolor="ccffcc"
| 51 || June 18 || @ Dodgers || 6–3 || Heintzelman (5–3) || Barney || — || 32,565 || 23–28
|- bgcolor="ffbbbb"
| 52 || June 19 || @ Dodgers || 0–7 || Hatten || Roe (2–4) || — || 13,093 || 23–29
|- bgcolor="ffbbbb"
| 53 || June 20 || @ Dodgers || 3–7 || Higbe || Strincevich (0–7) || — || 9,490 || 23–30
|- bgcolor="ffbbbb"
| 54 || June 21 || @ Braves || 2–3 || Cooper || Ostermueller (6–3) || — || 13,256 || 23–31
|- bgcolor="ffbbbb"
| 55 || June 22 || @ Braves || 3–4 (10) || Roser || Sewell (4–4) || — || 4,421 || 23–32
|- bgcolor="ffbbbb"
| 56 || June 23 || @ Braves || 3–4 || Lee || Heintzelman (5–4) || Posedel ||  || 23–33
|- bgcolor="ffbbbb"
| 57 || June 23 || @ Braves || 0–4 || Sain || Roe (2–5) || — || 19,784 || 23–34
|- bgcolor="ccffcc"
| 58 || June 25 || @ Giants || 3–0 || Strincevich (1–7) || Schumacher || — || 20,317 || 24–34
|- bgcolor="ffbbbb"
| 59 || June 26 || @ Giants || 0–4 || Koslo || Bahr (3–2) || — || 4,812 || 24–35
|- bgcolor="ffbbbb"
| 60 || June 27 || Cubs || 5–6 || Erickson || Hallett (2–3) || Schmitz || 3,019 || 24–36
|- bgcolor="ffbbbb"
| 61 || June 28 || Cardinals || 1–5 || Pollet || Roe (2–6) || — || 20,475 || 24–37
|- bgcolor="ccffcc"
| 62 || June 30 || Cardinals || 4–3 || Ostermueller (7–3) || Brazle || — ||  || 25–37
|- bgcolor="ccffcc"
| 63 || June 30 || Cardinals || 1–0 || Strincevich (2–7) || Brecheen || — || 20,040 || 26–37
|-

|- bgcolor="ccffcc"
| 64 || July 1 || @ Cubs || 1–0 || Sewell (5–4) || Wyse || — || 18,828 || 27–37
|- bgcolor="ccffcc"
| 65 || July 2 || @ Cubs || 9–0 || Heintzelman (6–4) || Chipman || — || 12,970 || 28–37
|- bgcolor="ffbbbb"
| 66 || July 3 || @ Cubs || 3–4 || Kush || Gerheauser (0–1) || — ||  || 28–38
|- bgcolor="ffbbbb"
| 67 || July 3 || @ Cubs || 1–2 || Erickson || Roe (2–7) || — || 25,623 || 28–39
|- bgcolor="ccffcc"
| 68 || July 4 || @ Reds || 6–1 || Strincevich (3–7) || Heusser || — ||  || 29–39
|- bgcolor="ffbbbb"
| 69 || July 4 || @ Reds || 3–4 (11) || Shoun || Albosta (0–4) || — || 15,437 || 29–40
|- bgcolor="ffbbbb"
| 70 || July 5 || @ Reds || 3–4 || Walters || Sewell (5–5) || — || 18,519 || 29–41
|- bgcolor="ffbbbb"
| 71 || July 6 || @ Cardinals || 4–12 || Wilks || Gables (0–4) || — || 12,660 || 29–42
|- bgcolor="ffbbbb"
| 72 || July 7 || @ Cardinals || 3–4 || Dickson || Ostermueller (7–4) || — ||  || 29–43
|- bgcolor="ffbbbb"
| 73 || July 7 || @ Cardinals || 0–6 || Pollet || Heintzelman (6–5) || — || 16,625 || 29–44
|- bgcolor="ffbbbb"
| 74 || July 11 || Phillies || 1–4 || Rowe || Strincevich (3–8) || — || 3,772 || 29–45
|- bgcolor="ccffcc"
| 75 || July 12 || Phillies || 4–3 || Bahr (4–2) || Judd || Roe (2) || 15,047 || 30–45
|- bgcolor="ccffcc"
| 76 || July 13 || Phillies || 8–1 || Lanning (2–1) || Schanz || — || 5,011 || 31–45
|- bgcolor="ffbbbb"
| 77 || July 14 || Braves || 1–4 || Spahn || Ostermueller (7–5) || — ||  || 31–46
|- bgcolor="ccffcc"
| 78 || July 14 || Braves || 5–2 || Sewell (6–5) || Wright || — || 17,414 || 32–46
|- bgcolor="ffbbbb"
| 79 || July 15 || Braves || 2–3 || Niggeling || Heintzelman (6–6) || — || 11,787 || 32–47
|- bgcolor="ffbbbb"
| 80 || July 16 || Braves || 0–10 || Cooper || Albosta (0–5) || — || 2,387 || 32–48
|- bgcolor="ccffcc"
| 81 || July 17 || Giants || 8–5 || Strincevich (4–8) || Trinkle || — ||  || 33–48
|- bgcolor="ccffcc"
| 82 || July 18 || Giants || 7–3 || Roe (3–7) || Koslo || Lanning (1) || 3,397 || 34–48
|- bgcolor="ffbbbb"
| 83 || July 20 || Dodgers || 1–4 || Herring || Heintzelman (6–7) || — || 7,736 || 34–49
|- bgcolor="ffbbbb"
| 84 || July 21 || Dodgers || 0–3 || Lombardi || Ostermueller (7–6) || — ||  || 34–50
|- bgcolor="ffbbbb"
| 85 || July 21 || Dodgers || 5–6 || Behrman || Sewell (6–6) || Gregg || 18,844 || 34–51
|- bgcolor="ffbbbb"
| 86 || July 24 || @ Phillies || 0–2 || Rowe || Strincevich (4–9) || — || 22,025 || 34–52
|- bgcolor="ccffcc"
| 87 || July 25 || @ Phillies || 2–1 || Lanning (3–1) || Judd || — ||  || 35–52
|- bgcolor="ffbbbb"
| 88 || July 25 || @ Phillies || 2–9 || Donnelly || Sewell (6–7) || — || 10,252 || 35–53
|- bgcolor="ccffcc"
| 89 || July 26 || @ Dodgers || 5–0 || Ostermueller (8–6) || Lombardi || — || 26,918 || 36–53
|- bgcolor="ffbbbb"
| 90 || July 27 || @ Dodgers || 3–4 || Casey || Roe (3–8) || — || 33,645 || 36–54
|- bgcolor="ffbbbb"
| 91 || July 27 || @ Dodgers || 3–4 || Higbe || Albosta (0–6) || Casey || 33,645 || 36–55
|- bgcolor="ccffcc"
| 92 || July 28 || @ Dodgers || 7–3 || Strincevich (5–9) || Barney || — || 19,836 || 37–55
|- bgcolor="ffbbbb"
| 93 || July 31 || @ Braves || 1–2 || Sain || Lanning (3–2) || — || 9,343 || 37–56
|-

|- bgcolor="ccffcc"
| 94 || August 2 || @ Giants || 6–0 || Ostermueller (9–6) || Koslo || — || 11,873 || 38–56
|- bgcolor="ffbbbb"
| 95 || August 2 || @ Giants || 2–3 || Trinkle || Heintzelman (6–8) || Thompson || 12,561 || 38–57
|- bgcolor="ffbbbb"
| 96 || August 4 || @ Giants || 0–4 || Budnick || Strincevich (5–10) || — ||  || 38–58
|- bgcolor="ffbbbb"
| 97 || August 4 || @ Giants || 1–10 || Kennedy || Lanning (3–3) || — || 27,709 || 38–59
|- bgcolor="ffbbbb"
| 98 || August 7 || Cardinals || 1–8 || Brecheen || Ostermueller (9–7) || — || 14,888 || 38–60
|- bgcolor="ffbbbb"
| 99 || August 9 || Cubs || 3–9 || Erickson || Heintzelman (6–9) || — || 13,624 || 38–61
|- bgcolor="ccffcc"
| 100 || August 10 || Cubs || 3–2 || Strincevich (6–10) || Schmitz || — || 3,452 || 39–61
|- bgcolor="ccffcc"
| 101 || August 11 || Cubs || 10–9 || Gerheauser (1–1) || Borowy || — ||  || 40–61
|- bgcolor="ffffff"
| 102 || August 11 || Cubs || 4–4 ||  ||  || — || 18,700 || 40–61
|- bgcolor="ccffcc"
| 103 || August 12 || Reds || 3–2 || Bahr (5–2) || Heusser || — || 2,764 || 41–61
|- bgcolor="ccffcc"
| 104 || August 13 || Reds || 3–2 || Hallett (3–3) || Gumbert || — || 15,575 || 42–61
|- bgcolor="ccffcc"
| 105 || August 14 || Reds || 3–2 || Strincevich (7–10) || Malloy || — || 3,890 || 43–61
|- bgcolor="ccffcc"
| 106 || August 16 || @ Cardinals || 3–0 || Heintzelman (7–9) || Dickson || — || 10,795 || 44–61
|- bgcolor="ffbbbb"
| 107 || August 17 || @ Cubs || 1–2 || Schmitz || Bahr (5–3) || — || 15,127 || 44–62
|- bgcolor="ffbbbb"
| 108 || August 18 || @ Cubs || 0–8 || Erickson || Hallett (3–4) || — || 30,965 || 44–63
|- bgcolor="ccffcc"
| 109 || August 20 || Dodgers || 10–0 || Strincevich (8–10) || Lombardi || — || 31,106 || 45–63
|- bgcolor="ffbbbb"
| 110 || August 21 || Dodgers || 2–8 || Hatten || Heintzelman (7–10) || — || 7,974 || 45–64
|- bgcolor="ffbbbb"
| 111 || August 22 || Giants || 0–1 (10) || Kennedy || Sewell (6–8) || — || 3,958 || 45–65
|- bgcolor="ccffcc"
| 112 || August 23 || Giants || 7–3 || Bahr (6–3) || Trinkle || — || 15,306 || 46–65
|- bgcolor="ffbbbb"
| 113 || August 24 || Giants || 1–8 || Voiselle || Lanning (3–4) || — || 5,260 || 46–66
|- bgcolor="ffbbbb"
| 114 || August 25 || Braves || 5–7 || Wright || Ostermueller (9–8) || Barrett ||  || 46–67
|- bgcolor="ffbbbb"
| 115 || August 25 || Braves || 5–10 || Johnson || Strincevich (8–11) || Spahn || 20,049 || 46–68
|- bgcolor="ccffcc"
| 116 || August 26 || Braves || 3–2 || Heintzelman (8–10) || Niggeling || — || 2,169 || 47–68
|- bgcolor="ffbbbb"
| 117 || August 27 || Braves || 1–9 || Spahn || Ostermueller (9–9) || — || 3,094 || 47–69
|- bgcolor="ffbbbb"
| 118 || August 28 || Phillies || 1–4 || Judd || Sewell (6–9) || Donnelly || 11,594 || 47–70
|- bgcolor="ffbbbb"
| 119 || August 29 || Phillies || 2–5 || Raffensberger || Bahr (6–4) || — || 1,124 || 47–71
|- bgcolor="ccffcc"
| 120 || August 31 || Cardinals || 6–1 || Strincevich (9–11) || Dickson || — || 6,074 || 48–71
|-

|- bgcolor="ffbbbb"
| 121 || September 1 || Cardinals || 6–7 (10) || Pollet || Sewell (6–10) || — ||  || 48–72
|- bgcolor="ccffcc"
| 122 || September 1 || Cardinals || 2–1 (7) || Ostermueller (10–9) || Brecheen || — || 28,167 || 49–72
|- bgcolor="ccffcc"
| 123 || September 2 || Cubs || 4–1 || Bahr (7–4) || Erickson || — ||  || 50–72
|- bgcolor="ffbbbb"
| 124 || September 2 || Cubs || 3–7 || Bauers || Sewell (6–11) || — || 18,237 || 50–73
|- bgcolor="ffbbbb"
| 125 || September 3 || Cubs || 0–2 || Chipman || Hallett (3–5) || — || 1,802 || 50–74
|- bgcolor="ffbbbb"
| 126 || September 4 || @ Reds || 0–6 || Beggs || Strincevich (9–12) || — || 10,465 || 50–75
|- bgcolor="ccffcc"
| 127 || September 5 || @ Reds || 2–1 || Sewell (7–11) || Vander Meer || — || 1,254 || 51–75
|- bgcolor="ffbbbb"
| 128 || September 6 || @ Cardinals || 6–7 || Beazley || Heintzelman (8–11) || Burkhart || 17,496 || 51–76
|- bgcolor="ccffcc"
| 129 || September 7 || @ Cardinals || 9–2 || Ostermueller (11–9) || Pollet || — || 17,266 || 52–76
|- bgcolor="ffbbbb"
| 130 || September 8 || @ Cardinals || 4–5 (11) || Munger || Bahr (7–5) || — ||  || 52–77
|- bgcolor="ffbbbb"
| 131 || September 8 || @ Cardinals || 2–12 || Brazle || Strincevich (9–13) || — || 25,572 || 52–78
|- bgcolor="ccffcc"
| 132 || September 10 || @ Giants || 7–4 || Gerheauser (2–1) || Trinkle || — || 9,971 || 53–78
|- bgcolor="ccffcc"
| 133 || September 11 || @ Giants || 7–6 || Lanning (4–4) || Thompson || — ||  || 54–78
|- bgcolor="ccffcc"
| 134 || September 11 || @ Giants || 7–5 || Gables (1–4) || Voiselle || Heintzelman (1) || 6,358 || 55–78
|- bgcolor="ccffcc"
| 135 || September 12 || @ Braves || 1–0 || Hallett (4–5) || Johnson || — ||  || 56–78
|- bgcolor="ffbbbb"
| 136 || September 12 || @ Braves || 1–2 || Wright || Strincevich (9–14) || — || 3,822 || 56–79
|- bgcolor="ccffcc"
| 137 || September 13 || @ Braves || 4–2 (14) || Ostermueller (12–9) || Cooper || — ||  || 57–79
|- bgcolor="ccffcc"
| 138 || September 13 || @ Braves || 10–1 || Bahr (8–5) || Lee || — || 2,776 || 58–79
|- bgcolor="ffbbbb"
| 139 || September 14 || @ Braves || 3–9 || Sain || Gerheauser (2–2) || — || 6,077 || 58–80
|- bgcolor="ffbbbb"
| 140 || September 15 || @ Phillies || 5–6 (11) || Karl || Sewell (7–12) || — || 14,279 || 58–81
|- bgcolor="ffbbbb"
| 141 || September 16 || @ Phillies || 0–2 || Raffensberger || Hallett (4–6) || — || 19,247 || 58–82
|- bgcolor="ccffcc"
| 142 || September 18 || @ Dodgers || 3–2 || Ostermueller (13–9) || Higbe || — ||  || 59–82
|- bgcolor="ffbbbb"
| 143 || September 18 || @ Dodgers || 0–3 || Branca || Heintzelman (8–12) || — || 26,659 || 59–83
|- bgcolor="ffbbbb"
| 144 || September 19 || @ Dodgers || 0–7 || Gregg || Strincevich (9–15) || — || 11,462 || 59–84
|- bgcolor="ccffcc"
| 145 || September 21 || Reds || 2–1 (13) || Hallett (5–6) || Gumbert || — || 13,810 || 60–84
|- bgcolor="ffbbbb"
| 146 || September 22 || Reds || 2–4 || Beggs || Lanning (4–5) || — ||  || 60–85
|- bgcolor="ffbbbb"
| 147 || September 22 || Reds || 5–6 || Blackwell || Walsh (0–1) || Malloy || 11,138 || 60–86
|- bgcolor="ffbbbb"
| 148 || September 24 || @ Cubs || 3–13 || Erickson || Ostermueller (13–10) || Chipman ||  || 60–87
|- bgcolor="ccffcc"
| 149 || September 24 || @ Cubs || 13–0 (8) || Sewell (8–12) || Lade || — || 8,396 || 61–87
|- bgcolor="ccffcc"
| 150 || September 25 || @ Cubs || 6–5 (16) || Gables (2–4) || Lade || — || 3,339 || 62–87
|- bgcolor="ffbbbb"
| 151 || September 26 || @ Cubs || 3–5 || Hanyzewski || Hallett (5–7) || Meyer || 5,369 || 62–88
|- bgcolor="ffbbbb"
| 152 || September 27 || @ Reds || 0–8 || Beggs || Bahr (8–6) || — || 1,120 || 62–89
|- bgcolor="ccffcc"
| 153 || September 28 || @ Reds || 10–3 || Strincevich (10–15) || Blackwell || — || 1,930 || 63–89
|- bgcolor="ffbbbb"
| 154 || September 29 || @ Reds || 0–1 || Vander Meer || Howard (0–1) || — ||  || 63–90
|- bgcolor="ffbbbb"
| 155 || September 29 || @ Reds || 2–3 || Hetki || Tate (0–1) || — || 6,329 || 63–91
|-

|-
| Legend:       = Win       = Loss       = TieBold = Pirates team member

Opening Day lineup

Notable transactions 
 June 17, 1946: Frank Colman was purchased from the Pirates by the New York Yankees.
 September 25, 1946: The Pirates traded $35,000 to the Oakland Oaks for Wally Westlake. The Pirates completed the deal by sending Johnny Hutchings to the Oaks on December 5.

Roster

Player stats

Batting

Starters by position 
Note: Pos = Position; G = Games played; AB = At bats; H = Hits; Avg. = Batting average; HR = Home runs; RBI = Runs batted in

Other batters 
Note: G = Games played; AB = At bats; H = Hits; Avg. = Batting average; HR = Home runs; RBI = Runs batted in

Pitching

Starting pitchers 
Note: G = Games pitched; IP = Innings pitched; W = Wins; L = Losses; ERA = Earned run average; SO = Strikeouts

Other pitchers 
Note: G = Games pitched; IP = Innings pitched; W = Wins; L = Losses; ERA = Earned run average; SO = Strikeouts

Relief pitchers 
Note: G = Games pitched; W = Wins; L = Losses; SV = Saves; ERA = Earned run average; SO = Strikeouts

Farm system

LEAGUE CHAMPIONS: Anniston, Tallassee

References

External links
 1946 Pittsburgh Pirates team page at Baseball Reference
 1946 Pittsburgh Pirates Page at Baseball Almanac

Pittsburgh Pirates seasons
Pittsburgh Pirates season
Pittsburg Pir